The 2021 Lanka Premier League also known as Wolf777 News LPL T20, for sponsorship reasons, was the second edition of the Lanka Premier League (LPL) Twenty20 franchise cricket tournament in Sri Lanka. It took place from 5 to 23 December 2021. There were plans to increase the number of teams from five to six, but Sri Lanka Cricket (SLC) confirmed that five teams would take part, as per the first tournament.

In June 2021, Charith Senanayake was appointed as the chairman of the LPL Technical Committee for the 2021 Lanka Premier League. In the same month, SLC agreed the termination of the Colombo Kings and the Dambulla Viiking teams due to financial issues. SLC also confirmed that two new franchise teams would replace them. The following month, SLC also terminated the franchise of the Jaffna Stallions. Originally, the tournament was scheduled to be held between 30 July and 22 August 2021. On 9 July 2021, the tournament was rescheduled to be held from 19 November to 12 December 2021, due to unavailability of overseas players. In September 2021, Dambulla Viiking changed their name to Dambulla Giants after changing owners. Jaffna Stallions also changed their name to Jaffna Kings later that month. In October 2021, Kandy Tuskers changed their name to Kandy Warriors after announced as having new owners. In November 2021, Colombo Kings changed their name to Colombo Stars after being acquired by a new owner.

On 23 December 2021, Jaffna Kings beat Galle Gladiators by 23 runs in the final, to win their second successive LPL title.

Squads
The player draft was held on 9 November 2021. On 29 November 2021, all the captains and coaches were confirmed.

Venues
R. Premadasa Stadium in Colombo and Mahinda Rajapaksa International Cricket Stadium in Hambantota were selected as the venues.

Teams and standings

Points table

Match summary

League stage

The full schedule was published on 13 October 2021.

Playoffs

Preliminary

Eliminator

Qualifier 1

Qualifier 2

Final

Statistics

Most runs

Most wickets

References

External links
 Series home at ESPNCricinfo

2021 Lanka Premier League
2021 in Sri Lankan cricket
Lanka Premier League